Heitor Medina (born 22 November 1910, date of death unknown) was a Brazilian athlete. He competed in the men's javelin throw at the 1932 Summer Olympics.

References

1910 births
Year of death missing
Athletes (track and field) at the 1932 Summer Olympics
Brazilian male javelin throwers
Olympic athletes of Brazil
Athletes from Rio de Janeiro (city)